The men's sabre was one of seven fencing events on the fencing at the 1932 Summer Olympics programme. It was the ninth appearance of the event. The competition was held from 12 August 1932 to 13 August 1932. 25 fencers from 12 nations competed. Five additional fencers entered but did not start. Each nation was limited to three fencers. The event was won by György Piller of Hungary, the third of nine straight Games in which a Hungarian would win the event. Giulio Gaudini of Italy took silver, while another Hungarian (Endre Kabos) earned bronze.

Background

This was the ninth appearance of the event, which is the only fencing event to have been held at every Summer Olympics. Three of the twelve finalists from 1928 returned: silver medalist Attila Petschauer of Hungary, sixth-place finisher Erwin Casmir of Germany, and seventh-place finisher Arturo De Vecchi of Italy. The reigning gold medalist, Ödön Tersztyánszky, had been killed in a car accident in 1929. György Piller of Hungary was the two-time reigning world champion and favored among a strong Hungarian team.

Canada, Mexico, and Poland each made their debut in the men's sabre. Italy and Denmark each made their seventh appearance in the event, tied for most of any nation, each having missed two of the first three events but having appeared every Games since 1908.

Competition format

The competition format was a round-robin for each pool, with three rounds (preliminary, semifinals, and final). Bouts were to five touches. Pool placement depended on bouts won; not all bouts in a round-robin were played if unnecessary to determine qualification for the next round; Erwin Casmir, for example, fenced only three bouts rather than seven in an eight-person preliminary pool because his three wins were sufficient to put him in fourth place and qualify him for the semifinals. Touches against was typically used as a tie-breaker for placement (including breaking a tie for the bronze medal), but fence-off barrages were used to determine qualification in the semifinals.
 Quarterfinals: There were 3 pools of between 8 and 9 fencers each (after withdrawals). The top 6 fencers in each quarterfinal advanced to the semifinals.
 Semifinals: There were 2 pools of 9 fencers each. The top 5 fencers in each semifinal advanced to the final.
 Final: The final pool had 10 fencers.

Schedule

Results

Quarterfinals

The top six fencers in each pool qualified for the semifinals.

Quarterfinal 1

Quarterfinal 2

Quarterfinal 3

Semifinals

The top five fencers in each semifinal advanced to the final.

Semifinal 2

The three-way tie for fourth place was broken through a barrage rather than by touches against. Cohn-Armitage placed first in that barrage (fourth in the overall pool), with Salafia second (fifth overall) and Bruder third (sixth overall, and not qualified for the final). The Official Report contains no explanation why Piot, who won no bouts, was ranked higher than Haro, who won one.

Final

References

Sabre men
Men's events at the 1932 Summer Olympics